Brook of Egypt is the name used in some English translations of the Bible (e.g., JPS 1917, NKJV, NLT) for the Hebrew , naḥal mizraim ("Wadi of Egypt" NRSV), a river (bed) forming the southernmost border of the Land of Israel. A number of scholars in the past identified it with Wadi El-Arish, an epiphemeral river flowing into the Mediterranean sea near the Egyptian city of Arish, while other scholars, including Israeli archaeologist Nadav Na'aman and the Italian Mario Liverani believe that the Besor stream, just to the south of Gaza, is the "Brook of Egypt" referenced in the Bible. A related phrase is nahar mizraim ("river of Egypt"), used in Genesis .

Nahal Besor
The Israeli archaeologist Nadav Na'aman and the Italian Mario Liverani have suggested that Wadi Gaza or Nahal Besor, was the Brook of Egypt. Certainly, it was controlled by Egypt in the Late Bronze Age and inhabited by Philistines into the Iron Age.

Wadi el-Arish 
According to Exodus , the locality from which the Israelites journeyed after departing Egypt was Sukkot. The name Sukkot means "palm huts" in Hebrew and was translated El-Arish in Arabic. It lies in the vicinity of El-Arish, the hometown of the Jewish commentator Saadia Gaon who identified Naḥal Mizraim with the wadi of El-Arish.

The Septuagint translates Naḥal Mizraim in Isaiah  as Rhinocorura.

Although in later Hebrew the term naḥal tended to be used for small rivers, in Biblical Hebrew, the word could be used for any wadi or river valley.

According to Sara Japhet,

"Nahal Mizraim" is Wadi el-Arish, which empties into the Mediterranean Sea about 30 miles south of Raphia, and "Shihor Mizraim" is the Nile.

Possible interpretation as the Nile
One traditional Jewish understanding of the term Naḥal Mizraim is that it refers to the Nile. This view appears in the  Palestinian Targum on Numbers 34:5, where נחלה מצרים in translated נילוס דמצריי ("the Nile of the Egyptians"; preserved in the Neophiti and Vatican manuscripts, as well as in Pseudo-Jonathan), as well as in a few  medieval commentators, such as Rashi and David Kimhi on Joshua 13:3. However, most commentators, such as Targum Onkelos, Abraham Ibn Ezra, Bahya ben Asher, Samuel David Luzzatto, Naftali Zvi Yehuda Berlin and Moisè Tedeschi on Numbers 34:5, reject this interpretation.

References

Egypt